Science News (SN) is an American bi-weekly magazine devoted to articles about new scientific and technical developments, typically gleaned from recent scientific and technical journals.

History
Science News has been published since 1922 by Society for Science & the Public, a non-profit organization founded by E. W. Scripps in 1920. American chemist Edwin Slosson served as the publication's first editor. From 1922 to 1966, it was called Science News Letter. The title was changed to Science News with the March 12, 1966 issue (vol. 89, no. 11).

Tom Siegfried was the editor from 2007 to 2012. In 2012, Siegfried stepped down, and Eva Emerson became the Editor in Chief of the magazine. In 2017, Eva Emerson stepped down to become the editor of a new digital magazine, Annual Reviews. On February 1, 2018 Nancy Shute became the Editor in Chief of the magazine.

In April 2008, the magazine changed from a weekly format to the current biweekly format, and the website was also redeployed. The April 12 issue (Vol.173 #15) was the last weekly issue. The first biweekly issue (Vol.173 #16) was dated May 10 and featured a new design. The 4-week break between the last weekly issue and first biweekly issue was explained in the Letter from the Publisher (p. 227) in the April 12 issue.

Departments
The articles of the magazine are placed under "News":  
 Life 
 Matter and Energy 
 Atom and Cosmos
 Body and Brain
 Earth
 Genes and Cells
The articles featured on the magazine's cover are placed under "Features". The departments that remain constant from issue to issue are:
 Editor's Note—A column written by Eva Emerson, the magazine's editor-in-chief, that usually highlights the current issue's prime topics.
 Notebook—A page that includes several sections:
 Say What?—A definition and description of a scientific term.
 50 Years Ago—An excerpt from an older issue of the magazine.
 Mystery Solved—An explanation of the science underlying everyday life.
 SN Online—Excerpts from articles published online.
 How Bizarre...—An odd or interesting fact that may not be well known to the magazine's audience.
 Reviews and Previews—A discussion of upcoming and recently released books, movies and services.
 Feedback—Letters from readers commenting on the recent Science News articles.
 Comment—An interview with a researcher.

Re-Issue
The journal is apparently a re-issue of the bi-weekly journal Science News, launched on November 1, 1878, from Salem, MA, edited by S. E. Cassino.

See also
Science News for Students

References

External links
Science News, the magazine's website
Science News Magazine Bookshop, appears to be an outlet for books reviewed in the magazine

Science and technology magazines published in the United States
Weekly magazines published in the United States
Biweekly magazines published in the United States
Magazines established in 1922
Magazines published in Washington, D.C.
Society for Science & the Public